Ana María Abello (Bogotá, October 4, 1979) is a Colombian actress, recognized mainly for having played Fabiana in the Colombian television series, the popular: Padres e hijos, where her television debut was, on that series in 1998, in the  Padres e hijos.  Since then, she has participated in well-known television series in her native country such as La Baby Sister, María Madrugada, Francisco el Matemático and La magia de Sofía.

Television 

 Padres e hijos (1998) — Fabiana

 La Baby Sister (2000) — Catalina

 María Madrugada (2002) — Judy

 El precio del silencio (2002) — Catalina

 La venganza (2002 TV series) (2002) — Adoración

 Francisco el Matemático (2004) — Mariana

 La sucursal del cielo (2007) — Judy

 La Magia de Sofia (2010) — Leonor

 Infiltrados (2011)

 ¿Quién mató a Patricia Soler? (2015) —

Films
In Marilyn y un Par de Ases (2000) as Connie.

References 

Living people
Colombian actresses
Colombian television actresses
1979 births
People from Bogotá